A weighted blanket is a heavy blanket that is used to aid sleep and reduce anxiety. Initially, weighted blankets were most commonly used as therapeutic tools to assist individuals with autism spectrum disorders (ASD), dementia, and mental health conditions. They have subsequently become a mass-market product. Scientific evidence for their efficacy is inconclusive, and experts assert that more research is needed to determine if weighted blankets actually lessen the impact of anxiety or insomnia.

Uses 
Weighted blankets are used in occupational therapy in an attempt to help individuals improve their emotional and physical regulation. Specifically, weighted blankets are used in a type of occupational therapy called "sensory integration therapy," which helps people with autism or other mental conditions focus on sensory experiences. Weighted blankets are just one of the many tools occupational therapists use to provide "deep-touch pressure," a form of physical stimulation that, according to experts, may help individuals regulate their emotions and behavior.

The main concern when considering a weighted blanket is to choose the appropriate weight because if the blanket is too light, it will just feel like a normal duvet, if instead, it is too heavy, it may feel uncomfortable. A weighted blanket should be about 10% of the person's body weight: this feels appropriate for about 97% of people. The blanket should also cover the body from the toes to the chin. When following the mentioned weight recommendation, if the weighted blanket weight doesn't feel right, it is much more likely for the blanket to be too heavy than too light.

Although early research indicates that weighted blankets may be an appropriate therapeutic tool when it comes to reducing anxiety, reviews of current medical literature note that research in this area is sparse.

Other studies have indicated that weighted blankets may reduce anxiety and, as a result, allow the wearer to fall asleep more quickly. However, medical experts also note that more research is needed into this area, as there is not yet enough evidence to prove that the products are helpful with insomnia. Additionally, there is a very real placebo effect when it comes to insomnia symptoms, which will need to be accounted for in future studies.

History 
Some of the earliest research into the form of deep-touch pressure that weighted blankets use took place in 1992, when an American scientist with autism, Temple Grandin, invented the Hug Machine and used it to study the calming effects of deep-touch pressure in patients with autistic disorder. The first official study of weighted blankets as an avenue for deep-touch pressure occurred in 1999, when Tina Champagne, an occupational therapist, began researching them as a coping device for individuals in the broader special-needs community.

Keith Zivalich created the "Beanie Blanket," an early iteration of a weighted blanket, around 2000. After receiving a Cease and Desist from the makers of Beanie Babies that same year, he settled on the name the "Bean Blanket."

Weighted blankets continued to increase in popularity in the special needs community, and several companies began creating product lines throughout the early- and mid-2000s. Zivalich changed the name of his "Bean Blanket" to the "Magic Weighted Blanket" in 2010. However, it wasn't until 2017 that weighted blankets secured mainstream popularity, when the science news site Futurism launched a Kickstarter campaign for a product called the Gravity Blanket and raised almost $5 million. The company sold more than 128,000 units by putting a new spin on the product and marketing it to the public as a sleep aid and stress reducer."

In 2018, Time magazine named "blankets that ease anxiety" one of the best inventions of 2018 and cited the Gravity Blanket specifically. They noted that although Futurism didn't invent the weighted blanket, the company perfected the art of marketing it to the masses. Along these same lines, The Atlantic linked the Gravity Blanket's success, and the subsequent rise in weighted blankets, to new way of describing and marketing their uses, describing the Gravity Blanket as a story about "the promise of life-changing comfort to the meditation-app-using, Instagram-shopping masses." The New Yorker linked the Gravity Blanket's popularity to both good timing and marketing, arguing that the previous years saw a marked rise in feelings of stress and worry in the United States and that it's "not coincidental that Gravity’s Kickstarter success arrived deep into a period when many Americans were beginning their e-mails with reflexive, panicked condolences about the news.”

Retail stores around the world began selling variations of the blankets throughout 2018 and, by the end of the year, weighted blankets were on practically every gift guide on the internet.

Since securing popularity, medical doctors have noted that, while some findings have been intriguing, more research is needed to verify the efficacy of the products as sleep aids and stress reducers.

Composition 

A common type of weighted blanket is made out of a fabric blanket divided into small compartments, which are then filled with plastic pellets or small beads. Plastic-filled blankets are typically more affordable, but bulkier; and some consumers prefer to avoid plastics for personal or environmental reasons. Glass or metal are considered less likely to cause allergic reactions; and due to their inherent density, less bulk is required to achieve the same weight.

All-fabric types of weighted blankets are also available. They are often knitted or crocheted with thick and heavy materials, such as T-shirt yarn (also known as "tarn" or "T-yarn", made out of T-shirt weight cotton), which is sometimes available as recycled materials, deadstock, or byproducts of the garment industry.

Safety and efficacy 

A 2018 systematic review, which investigated the effectiveness of using weighted blankets to decrease anxiety and insomnia, found that weighted blankets may be an appropriate therapeutic tool in reducing anxiety in limited settings and populations. However, the researchers also found that there is not enough evidence to suggest they are helpful with insomnia, and that more research is needed to "define guidelines for the use of weighted blankets in clinical practice and to investigate the underlying mechanism of action."

A 2021 double-blind randomized controlled trial found that a  weighted blanket was associated with reduced chronic pain compared to a  weighted blanket. Participants with high trait anxiety had greater pain relief. Weighted blankets did not significantly improve anxiety or sleep in the study.

Scientists caution that studies on the safety of weighted blankets in healthy adults cannot be generalized to children, and even less so to children with disabilities.

In a 2014 study, researchers tried to use weighted blankets to improve the sleep quality of children with autism. The study included a "placebo" blanket that contained light plastic beads to mimic the texture of the actual weighted blankets, which were filled with steel beads. The researchers measured how long it took children in the study to fall asleep, how often they woke during the night, and how long they slept in total using both reports by parents and activity monitors that the children wore. Dr. Paul Gringras, the head of the Children's Sleep Medicine Unit at the Evelina London Children's Hospital, who led the study, noted that the team found nothing to support their use.

A 2019 book published by Cambridge University Press noted that weighted blankets are increasingly being used to try to aid sleep in children with autism, despite the fact that there continues to be insufficient evidence at present to support this use.

For safe use, it is generally advised that a Weighted Blanket be approximately 10% of the user's body weight. For example, for a 7kg Weighted Blanket, the recommended body weight of the user would be somewhere between 60-80kg.

Care 

Due to size and weight, weighted blankets are often difficult to launder (some are also made of materials that cannot be machine-washed). Therefore, many blankets are sold alongside a machine-washable cover. Additionally, the blanket's weight may exceed the maximum load allowed by a washing machine, and should always be checked in advance. A delicate wash in cold water is generally preferred, as this preserves the properties of the padding material and prevents damage to the weighted pellets/beads. In most cases, how often to wash a weighted blanket depends on how the owner uses it.

Special care should also be exercised when drying a weighted blanket. Most manufacturers recommend flat drying the blankets. This can be achieved by using a flat surface, laying down a few towels to soak the excess water, and laying the weighted blanket on top to dry. Hang drying is discouraged because the weighted blanket may lose its shape and reduce its lifespan. Gentle air drying in the machine may be possible, depending on the weighted blanket filling and padding material. Plastic and synthetic fabric or padding materials may lose their properties due to excessive air temperature.

See also 
Weighted vests for children

References 

Blankets
Medical equipment